A list of films produced in Spain in 1957 (see 1957 in film).

1957

References

External links
 Spanish films of 1957 at the Internet Movie Database

1957
Spanish
Films